Layang Layang Aerospace Sdn Bhd (doing business as Layang Layang Aerospace) is a regional-charter airline based in Sabah, Malaysia. It also provides cargo services and also Emergency Medical Services (EMS).

Fleet
As of April 2016, Layang Layang Aerospace's fleet includes the following aircraft:

References

1994 establishments in Malaysia
Airlines of Malaysia
Privately held companies of Malaysia